Pierrat is a French surname. Notable people with the surname include:

Dominique Pierrat (1820–1893), French naturalist
Jean-Paul Pierrat (born 1952), French cross-country skier, brother of Claude
Claude Pierrat (born 1963), French cross-country skier

French-language surnames